Barbi Benton (born Barbara Lynn Klein; January 28, 1950) is an American retired model, actress, television personality, and singer. She is known for appearing in Playboy magazine, as a four-season regular on the comedy series Hee Haw, and for recording several modestly successful albums in the 1970s. After the birth of her first child in 1986, Benton retired from show business to raise her family.

Early life 
Benton was born Barbara Lynn Klein in New York City to a Jewish family. Her father was a gynecologist and her mother worked as an investment counselor.

She grew up in Sacramento and attended Rio Americano High School and took all kinds of lessons – from scuba diving to piano – and even did some "tearoom modeling" while in school. She enrolled into UCLA to become a veterinarian, but had to give up that career option as she could not stand the sight of blood.

Career 

At the age of 16, she began to model. Following high school, she attended UCLA, and at age 18 took a job with Playboy to appear on their entertainment show Playboy After Dark. She initially started as an extra on the show, but after host Hugh Hefner fell in love with Benton, her role was quickly elevated to co-host. After recording two episodes, Hefner asked the young co-ed for a date. Upon being asked, she reportedly demurred to the then-42-year-old Hefner: "I don't know, I've never dated anyone over 24 before." To which Hefner replied, "That's all right, neither have I." The two began a relationship that lasted several years, and placed Benton in the center of the Playboy enterprise. Hefner persuaded her to change her name from Barbara Klein to the more "marketable" Barbi Benton. She is credited with persuading Hefner to buy the Playboy Mansion in Holmby Hills in 1974.

Benton (initially credited as Barbi Klein) appeared on the cover of Playboy four times: July 1969, March 1970, May 1972, and December 1985 and in additional nude photo layouts in the December 1973 and January 1975 issues. Though she was featured in a number of photo-essays, she was never a Playmate of the Month. She landed a spot on television's Hee Haw doing short comedy sketches, and often appears as a dancer on some of the last series of The Rowen and martin laugh-in shows,and subsequently enjoyed a career as a country singer. She also began acting, and appeared in the West German comedy film The Naughty Cheerleader (1970), before appearing as a featured repeat performer on a number of popular television series, including The Bobby Vinton Show in 1976, The Love Boat and Fantasy Island”Laugh-in”. Benton lived with Hefner from 1969 until 1976 and is known for discovering the Playboy Mansion West, where Hefner resided until his death in 2017. Years later, when the television series The Girls Next Door visited her in Aspen, Colorado, she expressed gratitude that the two had remained friends.

Benton left Hee Haw after four seasons to concentrate on a more Hollywood-oriented career. She also starred in the short-lived 1977 ABC-TV comedy series Sugar Time!, about an aspiring female rock group and in films including the slasher Hospital Massacre (1982).

Benton achieved some success as a recording artist. Her record "Brass Buckles" (1975) was a top-five hit on Billboard's country singles chart. Benton has recorded eight albums, the last of which she personally produced in 1979. She also composed the songs, sang them, and played piano. One of her better-known songs was "Ain't That Just the Way" (1976). It was a number one hit in Sweden for five weeks, was also a major hit for Lutricia McNeal in 1996, and was recorded by the Dutch singer Patricia Paay under the title Poor Jeremy in 1977.

Personal life 
Benton married real estate developer George Gradow on October 14, 1979. They have two children, Alexander (born August 23, 1986) and Ariana (born July 13, 1988). They divide their time between homes in Aspen and Los Angeles.

Discography

Albums

Singles

Filmography 
How Did a Nice Girl Like You Get Into This Business? (a.k.a. Mir hat es immer Spaß gemacht) (1970, West Germany)
The Great American Beauty Contest (1973, TV movie)
The Third Girl from the Left (1973, TV movie)
For the Love of It (1980, TV movie)
Hospital Massacre (also known as X-Ray) (1982)
Deathstalker (1983)

Television appearances 
Playboy After Dark (1968), as herself
Hee Haw (1969), as herself
Rowan and Martins Laugh In-5th season-seen occasionally as a dancer in the party room
Marcus Welby, M.D. (1972), playing Liz in episode: "We'll Walk Out of Here Together" (episode # 4.3)
The Midnight Special (1973), as herself
American Bandstand (1975), guest artist
McCloud (1975), playing Shannon Forbes in episode "Park Avenue Pirates", performed "Brass Buckles" and "Ain't That Just The Way", in character, during the course of the episode
Nashville on the Road (1975), artist
The Bobby Vinton Show (1976), as herself
The Sonny & Cher Comedy Hour, (1977), as herself
Sugar Time! (1977), playing Maxx Douglas.
Fantasy Island:
as Shirley Russell in episode "Poof, You're a Movie Star" (season 1, 1978)
as Dee Dee Verona in episodes "The Appointment" and "Mr. Tattoo" (season 2, 1978)
as Bunny Kelly in episodes "Baby" and "Marathon: Battle of the Sexes" (season 3, 1979)
as Erica Clark in episodes "Playgirl" and "Smith's Valhalla" (season 3, 1980)
as Molly Delahanti in episodes "The Love Doctor", "Pleasure Palace" and "Possessed" (season 4, 1980).
episodes "The Devil and Mr. Roarke", "Ziegfeld Girls" and "Kid Corey Rides Again" (season 5, 1981).
as Marsha Garnett/Carla Baines in episodes "The Man from Yesterday" and "World's Most Desirable Woman" (season 4, 1981)
as Courtney/Miss Winslow in episodes "House of Dolls" and "Wuthering Heights" (season 5, 1982)
The Love Boat:
as Brigitte in episodes "Computerman", "Parlez-Vous" and "Memories of You" (1978)
as Kiki Atwood in episode "Marooned, parts 1 and 2" (1978)
as Lucy in episodes "Not Now, I'm Dying", "Eleanor's Return" and "Too Young to Love" (1979)
as Cathy Somms in episodes "The Nudist from Sunshine Gardens", "Eye of the Beholder" and "Bugged" (1981)
America 2-Night (1978), as herself, receiving the UBS Lifetime Achievement Award
Hollywood Squares (1978) as a guest panelist
Vega$ (1979), playing Holly in episode "Design For Death" (episode # 2.5)
The Tonight Show Starring Johnny Carson (1980), guest
Doug Henning's World of Magic V (1980), as an assistant in the "sawing a woman in half" illusion
When the Whistle Blows (1980), playing Dixie, or Miss Ironworker, in episode "Miss Hard Hat USA" (episode # 1.7)
Charlie's Angels (1980), playing Toni Green in episode "Island Angels" (episode # 5.5)
The Misadventures of Sheriff Lobo (1981) playing country singer Kitty Rhinestone in episode "The Cowboy Connection"
CHiPs (1981) playing Sal in episode "Ponch's Angels, parts 1 and 2" (episodes # 4.14/15)
Tattletales (1982–84) with playing partner George Gradow
The Match Game-Hollywood Squares Hour (1983) as a guest panelist
Circus of the Stars (1982, 1980, 1979), performer
Matt Houston (1983) playing Ava Randolph in episode "Purrfect Crime" (episode # 1.13)
Mickey Spillane's Mike Hammer (1984) playing Susan Lancaster in episode "Catfight" (episode # 2.4)
Hammer House of Mystery and Suspense And the Wall Came Tumbling Down (1984) playing Caroline Trent
Safe at Home (1985) playing Connie Simpson in episode "Old Flame"
Murder, She Wrote (1986) playing Sue Beth in episode "Murder in the Electric Cathedral" (episode # 2.16)
Riptide (1986), playing Gina Potter in episode "Playing Hardball" (episode # 3.17)
Barbi Benton Presents: Best Buns On the Beach (circa 1990), host
Barbi Benton Presents: Stripper of the Year (circa 1990), host
Hugh Hefner: Once Upon a Time (1992), as herself
Playboy: The Party Continues (2000), as herself
Entertainment Tonight (2002), as herself
Playboy's 50th Anniversary (2003), as herself
The Girls Next Door, as herself in "Fight Night" (2005), "Guess Who's Coming to Luncheon?" (2007), "Kickin' Aspen" (2008), and "The Wheel World" (2009)
The E! True Hollywood Story – Hugh Hefner: Girlfriends, Wives, and Centerfolds (2006), as herself.
Extreme Cribs: Episode 5 (2011), as herself
Million Dollar Rooms (2012, HGTV), featuring her "Copper Palace" mansion in Aspen, Colorado

Theater appearances 
I Love My Life (1982). This production of the hit 1978 Broadway musical comedy co-starred Barry Williams and was performed in January 1982 as part of the annual theatrical series at the La Mirada Civic Theatre in California. Benton received upbeat reviews for her performance as "Chloe."

References

External links 
 
 
 
 A tribute to Barbi Benton
 Fantasy Island – Titles & Air Dates Guide

Living people
Jewish women singers
Jewish American actresses
Jewish female models
American country singer-songwriters
American women country singers
Actresses from Sacramento, California
Musicians from Sacramento, California
Singer-songwriters from California
20th-century American actresses
20th-century American singers
20th-century American women singers
Country musicians from California
Playboy Records artists
21st-century American Jews
21st-century American women
1950 births